South Padre Island is a barrier island in the U.S. state of Texas. The remote landform is located in Cameron County, Willacy County, and accessible by the Queen Isabella Causeway. South Padre Island was formed when the creation of the Port Mansfield Channel split Padre Island in two. The resort city of South Padre Island, a popular vacation destination, is located on the island.

Before the arrival of European settlers in North America, the island was inhabited by native tribes. Western settlement is considered to have been started by Padre Jose Nicolas Balli, who set up a cattle ranch early in the 19th century. He and his family were driven out by the Mexican–American War and were unable to return because of the American Civil War.

Most of the island was closed by the National Park Service until 1962, after which settlement was allowed, and incomers began to establish an economy on the island and neighboring Port Isabel.  By 1978, the island had a population of around 314; a decade later, it had a population of 1,012 and 111 businesses. Being mainly coastline, the island's main source of income is tourism, with tens of thousands of college students flocking to the island every Spring Break. In winter, the island hosts "winter Texans": people (often retirees) from colder states who winter in the warm Texas climate. Isla Blanca Park, a preserve and recreational park, is located at the southern end of the island.

See also
Geography of Texas
North Padre Island
Padre Island National Seashore

References

External links

 
 Destination South Padre Island

Landforms of Cameron County, Texas
Landforms of Willacy County, Texas
South Padre